Yanyuan Subdistrict is a subdistrict of Haidian District, Beijing, It borders Qinghuayuan Subdistrict to its northeast, Zhongguancun Subdistrict to its southeast, Wanliu Area and Haidian Subdistrict to its south, and Qinglongqiao Subdistrict to its northwest. In 2020, it had a total population of 29,779.

The subdistrict was established in 1981. It derived its name from its location near the campus of Peking University, formerly known as Yanjing (Yenching) University. Currently it is co-administered by the Government of Haidian District and Peking University.

Administrative Divisions 
Yanyuan Subdistrict was made up of 7 residential communities. They are listed in the table below:

See also
List of township-level divisions of Beijing

References 

Haidian District
Subdistricts of Beijing